Torry-Crittendon Farmhouse is a historic home located at Durham in Greene County, New York.  It was built about 1799 and renovated in the Greek Revival style about 1850.  It is a -story, heavy timber-frame rectangular house with a central chimney.  It is five bays wide and two bays deep on a stone foundation.  It was built for William Torry, an American Revolutionary War veteran and one of the town's early settlers.  It was purchased by Phares Chittenden in 1830.

It was listed on the National Register of Historic Places in 2010.

See also
National Register of Historic Places listings in Greene County, New York

References

Houses on the National Register of Historic Places in New York (state)
Greek Revival houses in New York (state)
Houses in Greene County, New York
National Register of Historic Places in Greene County, New York